Hydrometra is a genus of water measurers in the family Hydrometridae. There are more than 120 described species in Hydrometra.

See also
 List of Hydrometra species

References

Further reading

External links

 

Hydrometroidea
Gerromorpha genera
Articles created by Qbugbot